KBOP-LD, UHF digital channel 20, is a low-powered television station licensed to Dallas, Texas, United States and serving the Dallas–Fort Worth Metroplex. The station is owned and operated by D.T.V., LLC. It is not available on Charter Spectrum or FiOS from Frontier at this time.

History
The station started out as a Spanish independent in 1997 as K62CY on channel 62. Shortly, the station was moved to channel 31 as K31FA. This signal was overlapping KUVN-LP (before it moved to channel 47) reception, so in 2001, the station moved its broadcasts to channel 57 as K57IG where it picked up the Mas Musica affiliate passed over from K25FW and KLEG-LP. After 2 years, the station dropped Mas Musica and changed its format to paid programming as KSEX-LP. In 2009 the station went silent.

On January 5, 2011, KSEX swapped callsigns with San Diego TV station KBOP and resumed broadcasting on channel 20 nine days later with a sub-channel mixture of religious programming and infomercials.

Digital television
The station's digital signal is multiplexed:

Digital channels

References

External links

KBOP-LD
Television channels and stations established in 1997
Low-power television stations in the United States